is a Japanese manga written and illustrated by Sakuya Kurekoshi. It is licensed in North America by Digital Manga Publishing, which released the manga through its imprint, Juné, on 25 November 2007.

Reception
Mania Entertainment's Patricia Beard felt it was disappointing that more of From Up Above had not been released, as she felt it had a "cute story", and that Kurekoshi's art had "a fluidity and ease in the style" which lent itself to the tone of the story. Holly Ellingwood, writing for Active Anime, compared From Up Above to Fushigi Yuugi, praising the "imagination" in the details of the story, and Kurekoshi's "flowing art" and story.

References

External links

2006 manga
Yaoi anime and manga
Digital Manga Publishing titles